Latrobe Airport may refer to:

 Arnold Palmer Regional Airport in Latrobe, Pennsylvania, United States
 Latrobe Regional Airport in Morwell, Victoria, Australia